Augustówka is a neighbourhood, and an area of the Municipal Information System, in the city of Warsaw, Poland, located within the district of Mokotów.

Characteristics 

The eastern portion of Augustówka consists of the single-family housing, as well as green zones, consisting of allotment gardens, meadows, ponds and fields. It also includes Czerniakowskie, and Wilanowskie oxbow lakes near the Vistula river, which is part of an area known as Siekierki Arc.

The areas around the Augustówka Street and the Siekierki Way consists of heavy industry buildings, including the Siekierki Power Station.

History 

Between 1883 and 1890, the Fort X had been build within modern boundaries of Augustówka, as part of the series of fortifications of the Warsaw Fortress, build around Warsaw by the Russian Empire. In 1909, it was decided to decommission and demolish the fortifications of the Warsaw Fortress, due to the high costs of their maintenance, and as such the Fort V had been partially demolished in 1913.

By 1900, Augustówka was a small village located in the gmina (municipality) of Wilanów, within the Warsaw County. Since 20 October 1933, it functioned as one of its 13 gromadas (village assemblies). In 1943, the village had 482 inhabitants.

In 1939, during the Second World War, the Polish Armed Forces used the ruins of Fort X as defensive position against advancing Wehrmacht  forces of the Nazi Germany. In 1944, Wehrmacht  forces had used the ruins to defend themself from the Red Army of the Soviet Union. After the war, the area had been used as the military shooting range.

On 15 May 1951, the municipality of Wilanów, including Augustówka, were incorporated into the city of Warsaw.

In 1961, in Augustówka had been opened the Siekierki Power Station.

Citations

Notes

References 

Neighbourhoods of Mokotów